Marin Ljubić (born 18 October 1997) is a Croatian professional footballer who plays as a goalkeeper.

Career

Hajduk Split 
On 29 July 2018, Ljubić made his Hajduk Split debut, coming on as a substitute for Tomislav Duka in a 4–1 defeat against Osijek. Four days later, he got his first start and a European debut in UEFA Europa League second round qualifier against Slavia Sofia. Ljubić had a couple of saves and helped Hajduk reach third qualifying round after a 3–2 win in Sofia.

References

External links
 

1997 births
Living people
Footballers from Split, Croatia
Association football goalkeepers
Croatian footballers
HNK Hajduk Split II players
NK Primorac 1929 players
HNK Hajduk Split players
İstanbulspor footballers
NŠ Mura players
Second Football League (Croatia) players
First Football League (Croatia) players
Croatian Football League players
TFF First League players
Slovenian PrvaLiga players
Croatian expatriate footballers
Croatian expatriate sportspeople in Turkey
Expatriate footballers in Turkey
Croatian expatriate sportspeople in Slovenia
Expatriate footballers in Slovenia